Zebraplatys bulbus is a species of jumping spider.

Appearance
The species has a very flat body, the carapace is dark to blackish brown.

Name
The specific name is derived from the spherical spermatheca of the vulva.

Distribution
Zebraplatys bulbus is only known from Taiwan.
All other described Zebraplatys species are from Australia.

Literature

  (2002): Five new and four newly recorded species of jumping spiders from Taiwan (Araneae: Salticidae). Zoological Studies 41(1): 1-12. PDF
  (2007): The world spider catalog, version 8.0. American Museum of Natural History.

Salticidae
Spiders described in 2002
Spiders of Taiwan